Hostel is a 2005 horror film written and directed by Eli Roth. It stars Jay Hernandez, Derek Richardson, Eyþór Guðjónsson, and Barbara Nedeljáková. It was produced by Mike Fleiss, Roth, and Chris Briggs, and executive produced by Boaz Yakin, Scott Spiegel, and Quentin Tarantino. The film follows a group of American tourists, as they end up in Slovakia where they are eventually taken one-by-one by an organization that allows people to torture and kill others.

Hostel was released theatrically in the United States by Lions Gate Films and Sony Pictures Releasing's Screen Gems on January 6, 2006, and in the Czech Republic by Falcon. The film received divisive reviews from critics, but grossed $82 million worldwide on a $4.8 million budget. It successfully launched a film series, and was followed by Hostel: Part II (2007) and Hostel: Part III (2011).

Plot
Two college students, Paxton Rodriguez and Josh Brooks, travel across Europe with their Icelandic friend Óli Eriksson. In the Netherlands, they visit an Amsterdam nightclub, followed by a brothel. Unable to get back into their hostel because of a curfew, they accept the offer of a man named Alexei to stay at his apartment. He convinces them that, instead of going to Barcelona, they should visit a hostel in Slovakia filled with beautiful women.

The three board a train to Slovakia, where they encounter a Dutch businessman, who touches Josh's leg. Josh yells at him, causing him to leave. Arriving in Slovakia, they find that their roommates in the hostel are two women, Natalya and Svetlana. The women invite them to a spa, and later to a disco. Josh has a run in with a gang of local criminal gipsy kids. The Dutch businessman intervenes to defend him. Josh apologizes for his reaction on the train.

Paxton and Josh have sex with Natalya and Svetlana, while Óli leaves with the desk girl, Vala. The next morning, Óli does not return. The two are approached by a Japanese woman named Kana, who shows them a photo of Óli and her friend Yuki, who is also missing. Elsewhere, Óli has been decapitated, while Yuki is being tortured. Josh is anxious to leave, but Paxton convinces him to stay one more night with Natalya and Svetlana. Both women slip the men tranquilizers. Josh faints on his bed. The ill Paxton ends up locked in the pantry.

Josh wakes up in a dungeon-like room, where the Dutch businessman begins maiming him with a drill, making holes in Josh's body, slicing his achilles tendons, then slitting his throat. Paxton wakes up in the disco and returns to the hostel, where he learns that he had supposedly checked out. He is greeted by two women who invite him to the spa. Suspicious, he locates Natalya and Svetlana; Natalya takes Paxton to an old factory, where he sees Josh's mutilated corpse being stitched together by the Dutch businessman. Two men drag Paxton down a hallway, passing by several rooms where other people are being tortured. Paxton is restrained and prepped to be tortured by a German client named Johann.

While cutting off a few of Paxton's fingers with a chainsaw, Johann unintentionally severs his hand restraints. Johann falls over, accidentally severing his own leg with the chainsaw. Paxton shoots Johann in the head with a gun. He then kills a guard, changes into business clothes, and finds a business card for the Elite Hunting Club, an organization that allows its clientele to pay to kill and mutilate tourists. Paxton also discovers Kana, whose face is being disfigured with a blowtorch by an American client. Paxton kills the man and rescues Kana and they flee in a stolen car, pursued by guards. Paxton runs over Natalya, Svetlana, and Alexei, killing two of them while the pursuing car finishes off the third. He also encounters the gipsy delinquents from earlier and gives them a big pack of candy and gum. They then attack and kill the men pursuing Paxton with concrete blocks.

The two make it to the train station. Kana, seeing her disfigured face, kills herself by leaping in front of an oncoming train, which attracts attention and allows Paxton to board another train unnoticed. Aboard, Paxton hears the voice of the Dutch businessman. When the train stops in Vienna, Austria, Paxton follows the Dutch businessman into a public restroom and makes him suffer and kills him in revenge for his friends’ deaths and suffering he caused him before boarding another train.

Alternate ending
In the director's cut of the film, Paxton follows the Dutch businessman being accompanied by his young daughter into a public restroom of a train station. After finding her teddy bear in the women's restroom, the Dutch businessman frantically searches the crowd for his missing daughter. Paxton is then seen aboard the moving train with the Dutch businessman's daughter, whom he has kidnapped.

Cast

 Jay Hernandez as Paxton Rodriguez
 Derek Richardson as Josh Brooks
 Eyþór Guðjónsson as Óli Eriksson
 Jennifer Lim as Kana
 Barbara Nedeljáková as Natalya 
 Jana Kaderabkova as Svetlana
 Jan Vlasák as The Dutch Businessman
 Rick Hoffman as The American Client
 Keiko Seiko as Yuki
 Lubomir Bukovy as Alexei
 Jana Havlickova as Vala
 Petr Janiš as Johann, the German Surgeon
 Takashi Miike as The Japanese Sadist
 Patrik Zigo as The Bubblegum Gang Leader
 Milda "Jedi" Havlas as Desk Clerk Jedi
 Miroslav Táborský as Police officer
 Josef Bradna as The Butcher
 Eli Roth as American Stoner

Production
After the release of Cabin Fever (2002), Eli Roth was met with praise from several industry figures, including Quentin Tarantino, who placed the film in his 'Top 10' of the year and immediately reached out to Roth in hopes of working with him on a future project. Roth was offered many studio directing jobs, mostly in the form of horror remakes such as The Last House on the Left, The Fog, and a film in the Texas Chainsaw Massacre franchise, among several others, but Tarantino advised him to turn down those offers to instead create an original horror story. While swimming in Tarantino's pool, Roth brainstormed an idea for a low-budget horror film based on a Thai "murder vacation" website he came across on the dark web. Tarantino loved the idea and encouraged Roth to immediately start writing a draft that day, which later formed the basis for Hostel.

Roth had originally debated creating the film in the style of a fake documentary that would incorporate real people and locations from supposed real underground "murder vacation" spots. When hardly any credible information could be found on the topic, the idea was scrapped in favor of a traditionally flowing narrative using fictional locations and characters. Principal photography took place in the Czech Republic, and many scenes were shot in Český Krumlov. The torture chamber scenes were filmed in the wing of a Prague hospital that had been abandoned since 1918.

The original music score was composed by Nathan Barr, who previously scored Cabin Fever, and commissioned The Prague FILMharmonic Orchestra to perform the score over a four-day period in October 2005.

Another one of Roth's ideas was that it would have an NC-17 rating, which he hoped would help boost the film's notoriety and marketing. When finished, the first cut of the film successfully received an NC-17 rating from the MPAA board mostly for its nudity and sexual content; the film originally had a real sex scene between two actors, including a real orgasm, which violated MPAA regulations. Over 20 minutes of footage had to be cut in order for the film to receive an R-rating. The film is rated 18 by the British Board of Film Classification.

Release

Box office
Hostel opened theatrically on January 6, 2006, in the United States and earned $19.6 million in its first weekend, ranking number one at the box office. By the end of its run, six weeks later, the film grossed $47.3 million in the US box office and $33.3 million internationally for a worldwide total of $80.6 million.

Critical response
Review aggregation website Rotten Tomatoes gives the film an approval rating of 59% based on 109 reviews and an average rating of 6.1/10. The site's critics consensus reads, "Featuring lots of guts and gore, Hostel is a wildly entertaining corpse-filled journey—assuming one is entertained by corpses, guts, and gore, that is." On Metacritic, the film had a weighted average score of 55 out of 100 based on 21 critics, indicating "mixed or average reviews". Audiences polled by CinemaScore gave the film an average grade of "C–" on an A+ to F scale.

Entertainment Weeklys film critic Owen Gleiberman commended the film's creativity, saying "You may or may not believe that slavering redneck psychos, of the kind who leer through Rob Zombie's The Devil's Rejects, can be found in the Southwest, but it's all too easy to envision this sort of depravity in the former Soviet bloc, the crack-up of which has produced a brutal marketplace of capitalistic fiendishness. The torture scenes in Hostel (snipped toes, sliced ankles, pulled eyeballs) are not, in essence, much different from the surgical terrors in the Saw films, only Roth, by presenting his characters as victims of the same world of flesh-for-fantasy they were grooving on in the first place, digs deep into the nightmare of a society ruled by the profit of illicit desire."

German film historian Florian Evers pointed out the Holocaust imagery behind Hostels horror iconography, connecting Roth's film to the Nazi exploitation genre.

The Guardian film critic Peter Bradshaw wrote that Hostel was "actually silly, crass and queasy. And not in a good way".<ref>Peter Bradshaw: "Hostel" review, at Guardian Unlimited</ref> David Edelstein of New York Magazine was equally negative, deriding director Roth with creating the horror subgenre "torture porn", or "gorno", using excessive violence to excite audiences like a sexual act. Jean-François Rauger, a film critic for Le Monde, a French newspaper, and programmer of the Cinémathèque Française, listed Hostel as the best American film of 2006, calling it an example of modern consumerism. Hostel'' won the 2006 Empire Award for Best Horror Film.

Slovak reaction to setting

The film's release was accompanied by strong complaints from Slovakia and the Czech Republic. Slovak and Czech officials were both disgusted and outraged by the film's portrayal of their countries as undeveloped, poor, and uncultured lands suffering from high criminality, war, and prostitution, fearing it would "damage the good reputation of Slovakia" and make foreigners feel it was a dangerous place to be. The tourist board of Slovakia invited Roth on an all-expenses-paid trip to their country so he could see it is not made up of run-down factories, ghettos, and kids who kill for bubble gum. Tomáš Galbavý, a Slovak Member of Parliament from the Slovak Democratic and Christian Union – Democratic Party, commented: "I am offended by this film. I think that all Slovaks should feel offended."

Defending himself, Roth said the film was not meant to be offensive, arguing, "Americans do not even know that this country exists. My film is not a geographical work but aims to show Americans' ignorance of the world around them." Roth argued that despite The Texas Chainsaw Massacre series, people still travel to Texas.

References

External links

 
 
 
 
 

2005 films
2005 horror films
2000s horror thriller films
American horror thriller films
2000s English-language films
2000s Czech-language films
2000s German-language films
2000s Icelandic-language films
2000s Japanese-language films
2000s Dutch-language films
2000s Russian-language films
Slovak-language films
American films about revenge
Films set in the Netherlands
Films set in Slovakia
Films shot in Germany
Films shot in the Czech Republic
American splatter films
Screen Gems films
Splatterpunk
Lionsgate films
Films directed by Eli Roth
Films produced by Eli Roth
Films produced by Quentin Tarantino
Films with screenplays by Eli Roth
Films scored by Nathan Barr
Torture in films
Films about human trafficking
Obscenity controversies in film
2000s American films